William Barnsley Allen  (8 June 1892 – 27 August 1933) was a British Army medical officer who was decorated for gallantry four times during the First World War, including an award of the Victoria Cross, the highest award for gallantry in the face of the enemy that can be awarded to British and Commonwealth forces.

Early life
Allen attended St Cuthbert's College, now Worksop College, then studied medicine at Sheffield University in the West Riding of Yorkshire. He graduated MB and ChB in 1914 and joined the Royal Army Medical Corps a few days after the United Kingdom declared war on Germany. He was commissioned as a lieutenant, and attached to the 3rd West Riding Field Ambulance.

First World War
In September 1916 Allen, by then promoted to captain, was awarded the Military Cross for actions on unspecified dates: 

On 3 September 1916 Allen was attached to the 246th (West Riding) Brigade, Royal Field Artillery, near Mesnil, France, when the following event took place for which he was awarded the Victoria Cross "for most conspicuous bravery and devotion to duty":

In 1917 Allen was awarded a Bar to his Military Cross:

For actions in October 1918 Allen (by then acting major) was awarded the Distinguished Service Order:

He also received a mention in despatches at the end of the war.

Allen died of an accidental drug overdose in 1933.

Legacy
His Victoria Cross is displayed at the Army Medical Services Museum in Mytchett, Surrey.

Allen was a member of Sheffield University Officers Training Corps while he was studying medicine. Just off the main mess in the Somme Barracks, home of Sheffield UOTC, there is an ante-room named the "Allen VC Room" which proudly displays on the wall a framed photograph of William, along with the citation as well as a copy of his VC and several of his other medals.

On 3 September 2016, 100 years after he received the Victoria Cross, a commemorative plaque was unveiled in his memory at the Sheffield War Memorial in Barkers' Pool.

References

Sources
 Willian Barnsley Allen Biography
 ALLEN, Major William Barnsley, Who Was Who, A & C Black, 1920–2008; online edn, Oxford University Press, Dec 2007, retrieved 19 November 2012

External links
Burial location of William Allen "West Sussex"
Location of William Allen's Victoria Cross "Army Medical Services Museum, Mytchett"
Major W.B. Allen

Royal Army Medical Corps officers
British Battle of the Somme recipients of the Victoria Cross
Military personnel from Sheffield
British Army personnel of World War I
Alumni of the University of Sheffield
1892 births
1933 deaths
People educated at Worksop College
Drug-related deaths in England
British Army recipients of the Victoria Cross
Recipients of the Military Cross
Companions of the Distinguished Service Order